The NEK Ladies Open was a tournament for professional female tennis players played on outdoor clay courts. The event was classified as a $60,000 ITF Women's Circuit tournament and was held in Budapest, Hungary, only in 2018. It ran from 27 August until 2 September.

Singles main draw entrants

Seeds 

 1 Rankings as of 20 August 2018.

Other entrants 
The following players received a wildcard into the singles main draw:
  Anna Bondár
  Dalma Gálfi
  Réka Luca Jani
  Panna Udvardy

The following players received entry from the qualifying draw:
  Maja Chwalińska
  Nina Potočnik
  Raluca Georgiana Șerban
  Oana Georgeta Simion

The following player received entry as a lucky loser:
  Nicoleta Dascălu

Champions

Singles

 Iga Świątek def.  Katarina Zavatska, 6–2, 6–2

Doubles

 Ulrikke Eikeri /  Elitsa Kostova def.  Dalma Gálfi /  Réka Luca Jani, 2–6, 6–4, [10–8]

External links 
 2018 NEK Ladies Open at ITFtennis.com
 Official website

2018 ITF Women's Circuit
Nek
Tennis tournaments in Hungary
ITF Women's World Tennis Tour
Recurring sporting events established in 2018
Clay court tennis tournaments
Recurring sporting events disestablished in 2018
Defunct sports competitions in Hungary